I Got Love In These Streetz is the fifth studio album by rapper Daz Dillinger. It was later re-released featuring over 10 bonus tracks.

Track listing
Intro 0:47 
I Got Love In These Streetz (produced by L.T. Hutton, engineered by Duke) 4:02
It Feels Good 2 Be From Tha Westcoast  (feat. Pornostyle) 3:50
Feel It (feat. Bun B)  3:55
That's What She Do 1:58
Tha Life Of A Playa 1:22
Get Hi 2:15
If U Want 2 Fuck Wit Me (feat. Houston's Finest) 4:16
My System (Tha Remix) 4:43
I Can't Spend Tha Night (feat. Crystal & Shon-Don (Of P.F.N.)) 3:59
It's Just Tha Way You Move  (feat. Gail Gotti)   4:17
Shake The Booty (produced by L.T. Hutton, engineered by Duke) 3:31  
Callin' My Name 4:37 
Shoot 'Em Up (feat. Crystal & Shon-Don (Of P.F.N.))  4:33
Gangsta Summer 3:16  
Love & Happiness 4:38
When Tha Feelin' Is Right (feat. Porscha, The Wicked Witch Of Tha South" & Licorishe) 4:44
I'ma Get Mine Anyway (feat. 5th Ward Boyz) 4:32

I GOT LOVE IN THESE STREETZ EP (2002)
Intro 0:45
I Got Love In These Streets 4:00
Only Move 4 Tha Money (So We Comin' Up) Featuring – 2Pac, Bad Azz, Makaveli 3:13
It's Just The Way U Move Featuring – Gail Gotti 4:16
Callin' My Name 4:37
Shake The Booty 3:31
Love:Happiness 4:38
When Tha Feelin' Is Right Featuring [Uncredited] – Licorishe, Porsha "Tha Wicked Witch Of Tha South" 4:46
Im'a Get Mine Anyway Featuring – 5th Ward Boyz 4:33

2004 albums
Daz Dillinger albums
Albums produced by Daz Dillinger